Aliefendioğlu is a village in Tarsus  district of Mersin Province, Turkey. At    it is situated in Çukurova (Cilicia of the antiquity) plains to  the south of Tarsus. The population of Aliefendioğlu is 1055  as of 2011.

References

Villages in Tarsus District